Play It Cool is a 1962 British musical film directed by Michael Winner and starring Billy Fury, Michael Anderson Jr., Helen Shapiro, Bobby Vee, Shane Fenton, Danny Williams, Dennis Price, Richard Wattis, Maurice Kaufmann and Anna Palk.

It was one of several pop musicals released around this time.

Plot
Struggling singer Billy Universe (Billy Fury) and his band befriend an heiress who, against the wishes of her father (Dennis Price), is searching for her lover whom she has been forbidden to see and with whom she is hoping to elope. The main characters visit a succession of nightclubs where other stars are performing. There are guest appearances by Lionel Blair and Bernie Winters, as well as by record producer Norrie Paramor. The only hit from the songs featured in the film was Fury's rendition of "Once Upon a Dream".

Cast
Billy Fury - Billy Universe 
Michael Anderson, Jr. - Alvin
Helen Shapiro - Herself 
Bobby Vee - Himself 
Dennis Price - Sir Charles Bryant 
Richard Wattis - Nervous Man 
Danny Williams - Himself 
Shane Fenton - Himself
Jimmy Crawford - Himself
Lionel Blair - Himself  
Anna Palk - Ann Bryant
Felicity Young - Yvonne Pemberton 
Ray Brooks - Freddy 
Jeremy Bulloch - Joey 
Maurice Kaufmann - Larry Granger 
Peter Barkworth - Skinner 
Bernie Winters - Sydney Norman

Production
It was an early film from Michael Winner who said he was given the job off the back of several short films he had made. He later commented: "they started to make pop films and that provided the break for young directors. The French New Wave had produced a few young directors and the idea of a director in his twenties was not totally unheard of. That’s how Sidney Furie came in, you know, with Cliff Richard. Dick Lester came in with It’s Trad Dad, and the same week I came in with a film called Play It Cool with Billy Fury."

Winner called it "Britain’s first twist film. Except nobody was twisting there yet, so they didn’t quite know what it was.... But working on a feature film of whatever calibre was obvious preferable to sitting at home waiting for the phone to ring." He wanted to make the movie on location in real clubs but the producers turned down the idea: “We don’t want to go into the West End where would we park the cars and have lunch? Besides we have all these lovely men at pinewood doing nothing and we think they ought to build something. So they put up a lot of rubbish as they always do a few potted plants and bits of hardboard with wallpaper on them then filled the place with extras looking bored."

Reception 
The New York Times, reviewer Eugene Archer called Fury "a Cockney imitation of Elvis Presley" and commented: "some low-budget British filmmakers have contrived a flimsy plot in which he and his gang of Teddyboys escort a pretty socialite around London's twist dives in search of her fickle fiancé. ... The film is full of wiggling hips, throbbing larynxes and youthful energy. As for the sound track–well, it's loud."

References

External links

1962 films
1962 musical comedy films
British musical comedy films
1960s English-language films
Films directed by Michael Winner
1960s British films